Gerrhonotus mccoyi is a species of lizard of the Anguidae family. It is found in Mexico.

References

Gerrhonotus
Reptiles of Mexico
Reptiles described in 2018
Taxobox binomials not recognized by IUCN